The 2009–10 season is Manchester City Football Club's eighth consecutive season playing in the Premier League, the top division of English football, and its thirteenth season since the Premier League was first created with Manchester City as one of its original 22 founding member clubs. Overall, it is the team's 118th season playing in a division of English football, most of which have been spent in the top flight. The club started the season under the management of Mark Hughes who was sacked in mid-December after the team drew seven consecutive matches in the Premier League. He was replaced by the Italian manager Roberto Mancini.

Season review
New manager Roberto Mancini began the season with only five months in the job at Eastlands.

With a prolific 29 goals in his first season at the club, Carlos Tevez was widely regarded as the club's best and most important player this season. The previous season's fan's favourite and top scorer, Robinho, was less successful, and in January he was loaned out to Brazilian club Santos for the remainder of the season only serving to emphasise the magnitude of his failure to deliver on the pitch anything remotely comparable to what he had already received in his bank account.

The team lost its last home game of the season to fellow rivals for landing one of the Premier League's "Top Four" elite slots, Tottenham Hotspur, in what had been dubbed by the media beforehand as the "Champions League play-off" game. Breaking the established stranglehold of the "Big Four" had been one of the ambitions of the club's new wealthy owners. However, one of the positives of the season's campaign was that the club reached its first major semi-final since 1981 before finally succumbing to the eventual trophy winners, Manchester United. The City team also notched up some highly noteworthy victories over the other "Top Four" incumbents, Chelsea and Arsenal.

In fact, Manchester City earned itself the distinction of being the only team to do the "league double" over the team that ultimately achieved the "league and cup double" this season.

Kit
Supplier: Umbro / Sponsor: Etihad Airways

Kit information
For the 2009–10 season, the shirt sponsor for all of the club's kits was Etihad Airways, which replaced the previous season's sponsor, Thomas Cook. There was also a change in the supplier of those kits for this season, with Nike-owned Umbro replacing the previous season's supplier, Le Coq Sportif. As a result of the switch from its prior French kit supplier to the Greater Manchester-based Umbro, all of the club's previous season's team and goalkeeper kits were essentially replaced with new ones for this season.

The overall sky blue colour of the first team kit was retained but the style and trim of this strip was significantly changed. Completely new away and third team kits were introduced, while a new all-green goalkeeper strip replaced the previous season's gold and black strip as the primary one for use by the goalkeepers, with a newly styled and trimmed variant of the old gold and black strip which became the secondary strip for use by the goalkeepers in away fixtures.

The new all-black away team kit came with gold vertical shoulder trim on the front that enabled the kit to be colour-coordinated with the gold and black goalkeeper strip, although it was sometimes also used with the all-green goalkeeper strip. This gold and black colour scheme was, according to its designer David Blanch, intended to be symbolic of the globe covered with bees (representing the world, to all parts of which the goods of the city were exported) that was featured on the city of Manchester coat of arms. That was because the Manchester City teams in the past have established the unique tradition of always wearing this crest on their shirts when playing at Wembley (or in a major cup final elsewhere) as a symbol of their pride in representing the city of Manchester at a major sporting event. In heraldic terms, the bee was symbolic of a hive of industry, and even today the Manchester bee was often used all by itself as a shorthand emblem for the city of Manchester.

The red and black diagonal sash across the white shirts of the new third team kit was intended as a nostalgic re-mastering of the original sashed strip worn by the City team in the 1970s,
while that original design had, in its turn, been a nod back at the classic red and black striped shirts with black shorts that had originally been introduced by coach Malcolm Allison in imitation of Milan's strip, and which was frequently worn in its cup ties by the successful trophy-winning City team of the late 1960s and early 1970s.

Historical league performance
Prior to this season, the history of Manchester City's performance in the English football league hierarchy since the creation of the Premier League in 1992 is summarised by the following timeline chart – which commences with the last season (1991–92) of the old Football League First Division (from which the Premier League was formed).

Friendly games

Pre-season

Vodacom Challenge

Mid-season

Joan Gamper Trophy

Emirates Foundation Cup

Competitive games

Premier League

Position in final standings

Results summary

Points breakdown

Points at home: 40 
Points away from home: 27 

Points against "Big Four" teams: 12 
Points against promoted teams: 14

6 points: Blackburn Rovers, Chelsea, Portsmouth, Wolverhampton Wanderers
4 points: Arsenal, Aston Villa, Birmingham City, Bolton Wanderers, Burnley,
Fulham, Stoke City, Sunderland, West Ham United, Wigan Athletic
2 points: Liverpool
1 point: Hull City
0 points: Everton, Manchester United, Tottenham Hotspur

Biggest & smallest
Biggest home win: 5–1 vs. Birmingham City, 11 April 2010 
Biggest home defeat: 0–2 vs. Everton, 24 March 2010 
Biggest away win: 1–6 vs. Burnley, 3 April 2010 
Biggest away defeat: 3–0 vs. Tottenham Hotspur, 16 December 2009

Biggest home attendance: 47,370 vs. Tottenham Hotspur, 5 May 2010 
Smallest home attendance: 40,292 vs. Blackburn Rovers, 11 January 2010 
Biggest away attendance: 75,066 vs. Manchester United, 20 September 2009 
Smallest away attendance: 17,826 vs. Portsmouth, 30 August 2009

Results by round

Matches

League Cup

FA Cup

Squad information
Source:

Playing statistics
Appearances (Apps.) numbers are for appearances in competitive games only including sub appearances
Red card numbers denote: Numbers in parentheses represent red cards overturned for wrongful dismissal.

Goalscorers
Includes all competitive matches. The list is sorted alphabetically by surname when total goals are equal.

Awards

Premier League Player of the Month award
Awarded monthly to the player that was chosen by a panel assembled by the Premier League's sponsor

PFA Fans' Player of the Month award
Awarded monthly to four players – one in each of the Premier League plus the three divisions of the Football League – those players being the ones that receive the most votes cast for that league in a poll conducted each month on the PFA's OWS (http://www.givemefootball.com) 

LMA Performance of the Week awardAwarded on a weekly basis to the Premier League or Football League team that a five-man LMA adjudication panel deems to have performed in some outstanding mannerEtihad Player of the Month awardsAwarded to the player in each category that receives the most votes in a poll conducted each month on the MCFC OWS''

Etihad / OSC Player of the Year awards

Transfers and loans

Transfers in

First team

Reserves & Academy

Transfers out

First team

Reserves & Academy

Loans in

First team

Reserves & Academy

Loans out

First team

Reserves & Academy

References

2009-010
2009–10 Premier League by team
Articles which contain graphical timelines